Khera Dona  is a village in Kapurthala district of Punjab State, India. The village is administrated by a Sarpanch, Kuljinder Singh, who is an elected representative of village as per the constitution of India and Panchayati raj (India). The next heir to the Sarpanch line is Anoop Singh, the eldest son.

Demography 
According to the report published by Census India in 2011,  Khera Dona has total number of 379 houses and population of 1,802 of which include 920 males and 882 females. Literacy rate of  Khera Dona is 79.50%, higher than state average of 75.84%.  The population of children under the age of 6 years is 153 which is 8.49% of total population of  Khera Dona, and child sex ratio is approximately  889, higher than state average of 846.

Population data

Air travel connectivity 
The closest airport to the village is Sri Guru Ram Dass Jee International Airport.

Villages in Kapurthala

References

External links
  Villages in Kapurthala
 Kapurthala Villages List

Villages in Kapurthala district